The Essence Festival, known as "the party with a purpose", is an annual music festival which started in 1995 as a one-time event to celebrate the 25th anniversary of Essence, a magazine aimed primarily towards African-American women. It became the largest African-American culture and music event in the United States.  Locally referred to as the Essence Fest, it has been held in New Orleans, Louisiana since 1995 except in 2006, when it was held in Houston, Texas due to Hurricane Katrina's effect on New Orleans and 2020 when it was cancelled. A spinoff iteration of the festival was also held in Durban, South Africa in November 2016. The festival features artists simultaneously performing on a main stage as well as four standing-room only superlounge stages.

In 2008, for the first time since its 1995 inception, the festival was not produced by the original producer team. Instead, Essence Communications, owner of the festival and the Essence magazine, contracted Rehage Entertainment Inc.

Starting 2013, Solomon Group became the Producer of Essence Festival.

In 2013, MSNBC broadcast live from the Essence Festival.  MSNBC returned for the 2014 festival.

2020 saw the event get cancelled with the COVID-19 pandemic to blame; the 26th is deferred to 2021, virtually.

Essence announced its return in 2022 to live event with The Walt Disney Company serving as sponsor.

Much of the 2017 film Girls Trip was filmed on location during the 2016 festival, casting over 5000 background actors with several scenes filmed afterward to recreate elements of the festival.

Concert line-up

2001

 Angie Stone 
 Bilal
 Brenda Russell 
 Carl Thomas 
 Clarence Carter 
 Destiny's Child 
 Donald Harrison
 Eric Benét 
 Erykah Badu 
 Irma Thomas 
 Jeffrey Osborne 
 Jill Scott 
 Joe 
 Kelly Price 
 Maze featuring Frankie Beverly
 Patti Austin 
 Patti LaBelle 
 Rebirth Brass Band
 Solomon Burke
 Steel Pulse 
 Steve Harvey 
 Teena Marie  
 The Dells 
 The O'Jays 
 The Roots 
 The Whispers 
 Tower of Power 
 Vintage 
 Yolanda Adams 
 Zion Golan

2002

 Al Green 
 Alicia Keys 
 Angie Stone 
 Average White Band 
 Babyface 
 Big Al Carson 
 Brian McKnight 
 Cedric the Entertainer 
 Denise LaSalle 
 De La Soul 
 Etta James 
 Faith Evans 
 Femi Kuti 
 Friends
 Gerald Levert 
 Glenn Lewis 
 India.Arie 
 Kindred the Family Soul 
 King Floyd 
 Luther Vandross 
 Mary J. Blige 
 Maze featuring Frankie Beverly
 Me'Shell Ndegeocello 
 Mike Phillips  
 Myself 
 Oleta Adams 
 Rahsaan Patterson 
 Steve Harvey 
 The Brothers Johnson 
 The Isley Brothers featuring Ronald Isley 
 The Ohio Players 
 The Roots 
 Tom Joyner & the Morning Show Crew 
 Tyrone Davis

2003

 All-Star Tribute to Luther Vandross
 Anita Baker 
 Ashanti 
 Biz Markie 
 Bobby "Blue" Bland
 Chaka Khan  
 Chuck Brown & The Soul Searchers
 Dianne Reeves 
 Doug E. Fresh
 Dwele  
 Erykah Badu 
 Faith Evans 
 Gerald Levert
 Groove Theory
 Heather Headley
 Jaguar Wright
 Jaheim
 Jamie Foxx 
 Keith Sweat
 Kelly Price 
 Kindred the Family Soul
 LL Cool J  
 Maze featuring Frankie Beverly
 Michael Franks
 Mo'Nique 
 Musiq Soulchild 
 Nappy Roots 
 Patti LaBelle 
 S.O.S. Band 
 Smokey Robinson
 Stevie Wonder
 The Bushwhackers 
 The Gap Band   
 Third World            
 Will Downing 
 Yolanda Adams

2004

 112 
 Anthony Hamilton
 Chanté Moore
 Common
 Dazz Band 
 Dionne Farris 
 Donnie McClurkin 
 Freddie Jackson
 Gladys Knight
 Irma Thomas
 Kem 
 Kenny Lattimore
 Lalah Hathaway 
 Ledisi  
 Little Milton 
 LL Cool J  
 Mary J. Blige 
 Maze featuring Frankie Beverly
 Millie Jackson  
 Morris Day & The Time 
 New Edition   
 Ohio Players 
 O'Jays 
 Prince  
 Rebirth Brass Band   
 Sinbad 
 Solomon Burke

2005

 Alicia Keys 
 Aretha Franklin 
 Black Eyed Peas
 Bobby Blue Bland
 Carl Thomas 
 Destiny's Child
 Doug E. Fresh
 Fantasia 
 Floetry 
 Jamia 
 Jeffrey Osborne 
 John Legend 
 Kanye West 
 Lionel Richie
 Lyfe Jennings 
 Maze featuring Frankie Beverly  
 Me'Shell Ndegeocello  
 Mint Condition 
 Mo'Nique 
 Regina Belle 
 Ruben Studdard 
 Slick Rick 
 Talib Kweli    
 Teena Marie 
 Terrence Blanchard 
 The Roots
 The Wailers
 Vivian Green

2006

 Bobby Brown performed alone and with New Edition
 Brand New Heavies 
 Cedric the Entertainer
 Charlie Wilson 
 Chris Brown Missed flight so did not perform. 
 Doug E. Fresh 
 Earth Wind & Fire 
 Goapele 
 Jaheim
 Jamie Foxx
 Keyshia Cole
 Kindred the Family Soul
 LL Cool J 
 Loose Ends
 Mary J. Blige 
 Maze featuring Frankie Beverly
 Michael Ward
 Mo'Nique 
 Musiq Soulchild 
 New Edition 
 Rebirth Brass Band 
 Slick Rick 
 Steve Harvey    
 Toni Braxton  
 Yolanda Adams 
Dres of Black Sheep (and some other rappers) turned up for impromptu performances during Doug E Fresh set.

Venue: Reliant Stadium in Houston, Texas

2007

 Angie Stone 
 Anthony David
 B-Legit 
 Barack Obama 
 Beyoncé
 Chanté Moore 
 Ciara 
 Chris Brown 
 Common 
 Cupid  
 Isley Brothers featuring Ronald Isley 
 Jermaine Paul 
 Kenny Lattimore 
 Kelly Rowland 
 Kindred the Family Soul
 LeVert
 Lionel Richie
 Ludacris 
 Lyfe Jennings 
 Mary J. Blige
 Maze featuring Frankie Beverly 
 MC Lyte 
 Mint Condition
 Najee    
 Ne-Yo 
 Nuttin' But Stringz 
 Pieces Of A Dream 
 Public Enemy 
 Rachelle Ferrell 
 Rahsaan Patterson 
 Rebirth Brass Band
 Robin Thicke
 Roi Anthony 
 Ruben Studdard  
 Smokie Norful 
 The O'Jays 
 Slum Village 
 Solange Knowles 
 Steve Harvey   
 Sunshine Anderson 
 Vanessa Bell Armstrong

2008
All Star Tribute To Patti LaBelle A celebration of Patti LaBelle featuring original LaBelle members Sarah Dash and Nona Hendryx - 
Kanye West - Chris Brown - Rihanna - J. Holiday - Peabo Bryson - Angie Stone - Mint Condition - Grandmaster Flash - Terence Blanchard - Big Sam's Funky Nation - Rebirth Brass Band - , Ledisi, Chrisette Michele, Ruby Amanfu and more - Jill Scott - LL Cool J - Musiq - Lyfe Jennings - Solange - Irvin Mayfield and the New Orleans Jazz Orchestra - Marva Wright - Cupid - Karina - Bamboula - Kermit Ruffins' tribute to Louis Armstrong - Maze featuring Frankie Beverly - Mary J. Blige - Chris Rock - Keyshia Cole - Morris Day & The Time - Chrisette Michele - Estelle - Raheem DeVaughn - Gil Scott-Heron - Irma Thomas - Preservation Hall Jazz Band's Gospel Revival - Nicholas Payton - Christian Scott

2009
Beyoncé - John Legend - Ne-Yo - Salt N Pepa - Eric Benet - Sharon Jones & The Dap-Kings - Solange - Sierra Leone Refugee All Stars - Keri Hilson - Marva Wright - Big Sam’s Funky Nation - Preservation Hall Jazz Band Revue - Dwele - Maxwell - Anita Baker - Robin Thicke - Charlie Wilson - Jazmine Sullivan - Ledisi - Janelle Monáe - Zap Mama - Irvin Mayfield - Little Freddie King - Maze featuring Frankie Beverly - Lionel Richie - Al Green - Teena Marie - En Vogue - Raphael Saadiq - Lalah Hathaway - Melanie Fiona - Ryan Leslie - Blind Boys of Alabama - The Knux - Trombone Shorty and Orleans Ave All Stars - Rebirth Brass Band - Laura Izibor

2010
Janet Jackson - Charlie Wilson - Raphael Saadiq - Monica - Chrisette Michele - Irma Thomas - Arrested Development - Big Sam's Funky Nation - Mary Mary - Irvin Mayfield & The NOJO - WAR - Little Freddie King - Alicia Keys - Gladys Knight - LL Cool J - Keri Hilson - Laura Izibor - Sam & Ruby - De La Soul - Kermit Ruffins & The BBQ Swingers - Mint Condition - Joe - Rebirth Brass Band - Earth Wind & Fire - Mary J. Blige - Jill Scott - Trey Songz - Estelle - Hot 8 Brass Band - Lalah Hathaway - Ivan Neville's Dumpstaphunk - Ruben Studdard - Melanie Fiona - PJ Morton Band - Soul Rebels Brass Band

2011

Usher - Charlie Wilson - Jennifer Hudson - Fantasia - Boyz II Men - Macy Gray - Dwele - Alexander O’Neal and Cherrelle - Mint Condition - Soul Rebels Brass Band - Tank - Miguel - Mavis Staples - Irma Thomas - Kanye West - Jill Scott - Chaka Khan - El Debarge - Eric Benet - Morris Day & The Time - Stephanie Mills - Naughty by Nature - To Be Continued Brass Band - Mary J. Blige - New Edition - Trey Songz - Loose Ends - Hal Linton - George Clinton & Parliament Funkadelic - Rebirth Brass Band - Kelly Price - Vanessa Bell Armstrong - Trin-i-Tee 5:7 - Brian Courtney Wilson - MC Lyte - Doug E. Fresh - Hot 8 Brass Band

2012

Diggy Simmons - OMG Girlz - Coco Jones - Square Off - Charlie Wilson - D'Angelo - Trey Songz - Keyshia Cole - The Pointer Sisters - Marsha Ambrosious - Kindred & The Family Soul - Vivian Green - Stephanie Mills - Gary Clark Jr. - Rebirth Brass Band - SWV - Goapele - Mary J. Blige - Kevin Hart - Ledisi - Mary Mary - Tank - Eric Roberson - Teedra Moses - The Stylistics - Robert Glasper - Dru Hill - Big Sam's Funky Nation - Chaka Khan - Aretha Franklin - Anthony Hamilton - Fantasia - Kirk Franklin - Syleena Johnson - Faith Evans - KeKe Wyatt - Nicci Gilbert - Melanie Fiona - Carl Thomas - Alex Boyd - Eve - Estelle - Luke James - Raheem DeVaughn - Bridget Kelly

2013
Beyoncé - Brandy - Maxwell - New Edition - Charlie Wilson - Keyshia Cole - St Beauty - Daley - LL Cool J - Malu Music - Maya Azucena - PJ Morton - Roman GianArthur - TGT - Trey Songz - Alice Smith - Bridget Kelly - Deep Cotton - Emeli Sandé - F. Stokes - Janelle Monáe - Jill Scott - Kourtney Heart - Leela James - Luke James - Mia Borders - Shamarr Allen and the Underdawgs - Simphiwe Dana - Anthony David - Big Daddy Kane - Bilal - Blackstreet - Chrisette Michelle - Faith Evans - Jody Watley - Les Nubians - Marsha Ambrosious - Mint Condition - Rachelle Ferrell - Tamia - Biz Markie - Brass-A-Holics - Carla Ferrell - Cupid - Doug E. Fresh - Gina Brown - Greta Prince - Mike Swift - Solange - Stooges Brass Band - Nephew Tommy - Tweet - Water Seed

2014
Prince - Nas - Janelle Monáe - Nile Rodgers - Mary J. Blige - Jill Scott - The Roots - Ledisi - Tank - Lionel Richie - Charlie Wilson - Erykah Badu - Jazmine Sullivan - Jesse Boykins III - Tevin Campbell - K. Michelle - Tamar Braxton - Trey Songz - 112 - Alice Smith - August Alsina - Big Sam's Funky Nation - Daley - Day26 - Doug E. Fresh - Elle Varner - Estelle - George Tandy, Jr. - Greta Prince - Jagged Edge - Kelly Prince - Kevin Ross - King - Kourtney Heart - Leela James - Liv Warfield - Marsha Ambrosius - Michelle Williams - Naughty by Nature - Raheem DeVaughn - Robert Glasper - Sebastian Mikael - Sevyn Streeter - Stephanie Mills - SWV - Tevin Campbell - The Original Pinettes Brass Band

2015
Usher - Missy Elliot - Kendrick Lamar - Mary J. Blige - Kevin Hart - Erykah Badu - Common - Maze Feat. Frankie Beverly, Charlie Wilson, India.Arie, Kem - Trey Songz - Adrian Marcel - AverySunshine - Lecrae - Doug E. Fresh - Grapple - Kelly Price - Kindred Te Family Soul - Luenell - Nico & Vinz - Slick Rick - Beenie Man & The Zagga Zow Band - Bilal - Elle Varner - Esperanza Spalding - Emily's D+Evolution - Kool Moe Dee - Mali Music - Mystical - Raheem DeVaughn - Sevyn Streeter - Tank - The Bangas - Tonya Boyd-Cannon - Trombone Shorty & Orleans Avenue - Floetry - Andra Day - Dee-1 - Dumpstaphunk - Eric Roberson - Jeff Bradshaw - Lianne La Havas - Mase - Robert Glasper - SZA - Tendra Moses - Tweet

2016

Main Stage
Friday: Estelle, Faith Evans, Tyrese, Kenny "Babyface" Edmonds, New Edition, Maxwell
Saturday: Jeremih, Common, Charlie Wilson, Mariah Carey
Sunday: Andra Day, Ciara, Puff Daddy & The Family, Kendrick Lamar

Superlounges
Friday: Digable Planets, Daley, Eric Bellinger, Lion Babe, The Internet, Tweet, Estelle, Mali Music, V. Bozeman, Kelly Price, Zakes Bantwini, Sky Wanda
Saturday: Doug E. Fresh, Tink, Jidenna, Preservation Hall Jazz Band, St. Beauty, Lalah HathawayJudith HillWizkid, Lady Leshurr
Sunday: MC Lyte, Dej Loaf, Cyril Neville, Leon Bridges, Kehlani, New Breed Brass Band, Robert Glasper, BJ the Chicago Kid, The Brand New Heavies, Little Simz

2017
Diana Ross - John Legend - Mary J. Blige - Chance the Rapper - Solange - Chaka Khan - Jill Scott - Master P - Trombone Shorty & Orleans Avenue - India.Arie - Monica - Jazmine Sullivan - Mystikal - Silkk the Shocker - Mia X - Rhonda Ross - Ari Lennox - BJ the Chicago Kid - Daley - Doug E. Fresh - Elle Varner - Emily Estefan - Gallant - Jhené Aiko - June's Diary - Kelly Price - Lalah Hathaway - Leela James - Lizzo - Michel'le - Moses Sumney - PJ - PJ Morton - Remy Ma - Ro James - Shaggy - Sir the Baptist - Teyana Taylor - The Jones Girls featuring Shirley Jones - Tweet - Yuna - Heels over Head (SA) - Rafiya - DAVE Everyseason - Lydia Caesar - Napoleon da Great - Cymphonique Miller - Yazz - Xscape

2018

Main Stage
Friday: Doug E. Fresh , Ledisi, Miguel, Snoop Dogg, The Roots 
Saturday: Doug E. Fresh , Xscape, Queen Latifah , Mary J. Blige
Sunday: Doug E. Fresh , Teddy Riley , Fantasia, Janet Jackson

Superlounges
Friday: Lloyd, H.E.R., Damien Escobar, Kelly Price, The Internet, Tweet, Estelle, Mali Music, V. Bozeman, Kelly Price, Zakes Bantwini, Sky Wanda
Saturday: Doug E. Fresh, Tink, Jidenna, Preservation Hall Jazz Band, St. Beauty, Lalah HathawayJudith HillWizkid, Lady Leshurr
Sunday: MC Lyte, Dej Loaf, Cyril Neville, Leon Bridges, Kehlani, New Breed Brass Band, Robert Glasper, BJ the Chicago Kid, The Brand New Heavies, Little Simz

2022 

 Chloe x Halle
 Debbie Allen
 Isley Brothers
 Lucky Daye
 New Edition
 City Girls
 Ghostface Killah
 Janet Jackson
 Patti LaBelle
 Stephanie Mills
 Nicki Minaj
 Raekwon
 The Roots
 Jazmine Sullivan
 Tems
 Carl Thomas
 Summer Walker
 Ashanti

See also

List of hip hop music festivals
List of blues festivals
Hip hop culture

References

External links
2020 Essence Festival of Culture July 1 - 5, 2020
2017 Essence Festival Concerts Tickets, Parties and Events Guide in New Orleans, LA
Essence Music Festival 2010 Review by UnRated Magazine
Essence returns with Kanye West, Chris Rock and a new producer
Essence '08 highlighted by new stage
Essence Fest Holds a "Coming Home" Party
Reviewing the Essence Festival's First 20 Years

Music festivals in Louisiana
Tourist attractions in New Orleans
African-American festivals
African-American history in New Orleans
Hip hop music festivals in the United States
Blues festivals in the United States
Folk festivals in the United States
Music festivals established in 1995
Magazine festivals
Caesars Superdome
Festivals in New Orleans